The Mortimer Webster House is a historic house in Stillwater, Minnesota, United States, constructed 1865–1866.  It is listed on the National Register of Historic Places in 1982 for having local significance in the themes of architecture and commerce.  It was nominated for being one of the best examples of Italianate architecture in Stillwater, and for its association with Mortimer Webster, one of the town's notable early entrepreneurs.

Description
The Mortimer Webster house is a two-story, wood-frame house originally built as a cube with a rooftop cupola.  Initially there were porches extending across the front and rear façades.  A one-story wing was added to the rear around 1900.

History
Mortimer Webster was born in Owego, New York, in 1836.  He worked as a house painter in the region before heading west in his late teens.  Following stops in Hudson and New Richmond, Wisconsin, he and his brother William arrived in Stillwater in the summer of 1856 and established a painting business.  In 1860 Webster transferred his livelihood to livery services and real estate.  By 1866 he was concentrating exclusively on real estate, and had prospered enough to commission this fine house on a bluff overlooking the town.  By the end of the decade he had platted two additions to Stillwater and by 1881 had significant interests in lots in the area as well as in Fargo, Dakota Territory.

Gallery

See also
 National Register of Historic Places listings in Washington County, Minnesota

References

External links

1866 establishments in Minnesota
Houses completed in 1866
Houses in Washington County, Minnesota
Houses on the National Register of Historic Places in Minnesota
Italianate architecture in Minnesota
Stillwater, Minnesota
National Register of Historic Places in Washington County, Minnesota